The first railway in Austria was the narrow-gauge line from Gmunden in the Salzkammergut to Budweis, now in the Czech Republic, this was  gauge. Some two dozen lines were built in  gauge, a few in  gauge. The first was the Steyrtalbahn. Others were built by provincial governments, some lines are still in common carrier use and a number of others are preservation projects.

384 km  gauge; 88 km  gauge (2008)

Metre-gauge railways
Achenseebahn, 6.78 km, steam engine.
Lokalbahn Vöcklamarkt–Attersee, 15.3 km and electrified.
Schafbergbahn,a cog railway, 5.85 km, steam engine.
Schneebergbahn, a cog railway, 9.85km
Stubaitalbahn, 18.2 km, now trams in Innsbruck Linie STB, Fulpmes-Innsbruck Hbf, electrified
Innsbrucker Mittelgebirgsbahn, 8.4 km and electrified. Now became trams in Innsbruck Linie 6, electrified.
Traunseebahn 14.9km, connects to the Gmunden tramway, electrified.
Lokalbahn Mödling–Hinterbrühl, 4.5 km, closed in 1932. It was the first electrified railway in Austria.
Straßenbahn Unterach–See am Mondsee, 3.26 km, closed in 1949.
Lokalbahn Innsbruck–Hall in Tirol, 11.8 km, closed in 1974.

900mm gauge railways
The Florianerbahn is a museum tramway in Upper Austria.
The Trams in Linz are electrified, operating at 600 V C, opened in 1913 and extended in 2009 when the Pöstlingbergbahn was integrated with the tramway after gauge conversion from metre gauge.

760mm gauge railways
Bregenzerwaldbahn 35.3 km, steam engine
Feistritztalbahn in Steiermark, 42.2 km, steam engine
Höllentalbahn, 5 km
Lokalbahn Ober-Grafendorf–Gresten in Lower Austria, 62.3 km, a branch of Mariazellerbahn. 
Lokalbahn Mixnitz–Sankt Erhard in Steiermark, 10.7 km, electrified.
Mariazellerbahn, from Sankt Pölten to Mariazell, 85 km electrified.
Murtalbahn, 76.1 km, steam engine
Pinzgauer Lokalbahn, from Zell am See to Krimml, 52.6 km
Stainzerbahn in Steiermark, 11.3 km, steam engine.
Steyrtalbahn, from Garsten to Klaus, 19.2 km, steam engine
Taurachbahn, a museum railway.
Vellachtalbahn in Kärnten, 17.5 km
Waldviertler Schmalspurbahnen in Lower Austria, 82 km, steam engine.
Ybbstalbahn, 76.6 km, steam engine.
Zillertalbahn, from Jenbach to Mayrhofen, 33.1 km, locomotive.
numerous logging railways build from surplus military equipment after 1918, no longer in operation.

750mm gauge railway
Dienstbahn der Internationalen Rheinregulierung, 25 km. Common freight carrier and partly a heritage railway

railway lines
; 1.7 km, operating
; 22 km, defunct
; 1.5 km, defunct
, 3.3 km, defunct
; 3.8 km, defunct
; 2.5 km, defunct
; 2 km, a defunct heritage railway

railway lines
Geriatriezentrum Am Wienerwald Feldbahn

See also

History of rail transport in Austria
Rail transport in Austria

References

Notes

Bibliography

External links